Damias marginipuncta is a moth of the family Erebidae. It is found in New Guinea.

References

Damias
Moths described in 1912